Peter Mackanin, Jr. (pronounced ; born August 1, 1951), is an American former professional baseball utility player, coach, scout, and manager, who played in Major League Baseball (MLB) for the Texas Rangers, Montreal Expos, Philadelphia Phillies, and Minnesota Twins, from  to .

On September 29, 2017, the team announced that Mackanin would not return as the Phillies’ field manager, for the  season.

Major league career
Mackanin was drafted by the Washington Senators in the 1969 Major League Baseball Draft and made his debut with them in 1973, after they moved and became the Texas Rangers. He was traded along with Don Stanhouse from the Rangers to the Montreal Expos for Willie Davis at the Winter Meetings on December 5, 1974. He also played with the Philadelphia Phillies and Minnesota Twins. Mackanin's best season offensively was in 1975, when he posted a .225 batting average, along with 12 home runs, and 44 runs batted in (RBI).

Career statistics
In a nine-year big league career, Mackanin’s career statistics include 548 games played, 355 hits, 1,570 at bats, a .226 career batting average, 30 home runs, 141 RBI, and an on-base percentage of .263. He ended his career with an overall .963 fielding percentage.

Managerial career

Early career
After retiring as a player, Mackanin spent many years managing and coaching in the minor leagues. He became the Expos' third base coach in 1997 and spent four years in that position. After managing the minor league Hickory Crawdads and Lynchburg Hillcats in 2001 and 2002, Mackanin became the bench coach for the Pittsburgh Pirates for the 2003 season. After Lloyd McClendon was fired, Mackanin served as the Pirates' interim manager for the last month of 2005, leading the team to a 12–14 record. He spent the next season managing in the Pirates' minor league system at Bradenton. 
 
Mackanin was hired by the Cincinnati Reds as a scout for the 2007 season, but when the team fired manager Jerry Narron on July 1 of that year, he was named the club's interim manager. Narron had led the Reds in the first half of the 2007 season to a league-worst 51 losses, but during Mackanin's tenure, the team had a winning percentage above .500. The Reds decided not to hire Mackanin on permanently for the 2008 campaign, instead deciding on veteran experience with Dusty Baker.

Mackanin was hired by the Philadelphia Phillies in 2009 as the bench coach. On October 3, 2012, the Phillies fired him by deciding not to renew his contract for the 2013 season. He was rehired by the Phillies for the 2014 season to be the 3rd base coach for Ryne Sandberg.

On June 26, 2015, Mackanin was appointed Phillies manager after Sandberg suddenly stepped down. In 2015 Mackanin was successful on a lower percentage of replay challenges than any other MLB manager with 10 or more challenges, at 76.2%.

On September 29, 2017, the Phillies announced that Mackanin would not return for the 2018 season, but would instead take on a front office role for the remainder of his contract.

Managerial record

Venezuelan League
In between Major league seasons, Mackanin played for the Leones del Caracas, Cardenales de Lara, and Águilas del Zulia clubs of the Venezuelan Winter League during five seasons spanning 1973–80. He later managed the Águilas in two seasons, guiding the team to the 1989 Caribbean Series title.

Personal life
Mackanin was born in Chicago, Illinois.  He is a graduate of Brother Rice High School and the University of Illinois at Chicago in Chicago.

Mackanin is married to Nancy and they have one son.

References

External links

Pete Mackanin at Pura Pelota (Venezuelan Professional Baseball League)

1951 births
Living people
Águilas del Zulia players
American expatriate baseball players in Canada
Baseball players from Chicago
Burlington Senators players
Cardenales de Lara players
Caribbean Series managers
Cincinnati Reds managers
Cincinnati Reds scouts
Denver Bears players
Iowa Cubs managers
Iowa Cubs players
Leones del Caracas players
American expatriate baseball players in Venezuela
Major League Baseball bench coaches
Major League Baseball second basemen
Minor league baseball managers
Minnesota Twins players
Montreal Expos coaches
Montreal Expos players
Nashville Sounds managers
New York Yankees scouts
Oklahoma City 89ers players
Sportspeople from Chicago
Philadelphia Phillies coaches
Philadelphia Phillies managers
Philadelphia Phillies players
Pittsburgh Pirates coaches
Pittsburgh Pirates managers
Pittsfield Rangers players
Spokane Indians players
Texas Rangers players
Wytheville Senators players